The 2005 Men's EuroHockey Nations Challenge I was the first edition of the Men's EuroHockey Nations Challenge I, the third level of the men's European field hockey championships organized by the European Hockey Federation. It was held in Vinnytsia, Ukraine, from September 11 to September 17, 2005.

The number one and two were promoted to the "B"-level, the 2007 Men's EuroHockey Nations Trophy, while no team was relegated to the "D"-level, the 2007 Men's EuroHockey Nations Challenge II.

Results

Preliminary round

Pool A

Pool B

Fifth to seventh place classification

5–7th place semi-final

Fifth place game

First to fourth place classification

Semi-finals

Third place game

Final

Final standings

 Promoted to the EuroHockey Nations Trophy

See also
2005 Men's EuroHockey Nations Trophy

External links
Complete results

EuroHockey Championship III
Men 3
EuroHockey Nations Challenge I Men
EuroHockey Nations Challenge I Men
International field hockey competitions hosted by Ukraine
Sport in Vinnytsia